Milan Puzrla (18 April 1946 – 24 May 2021) was a Czechoslovak cyclist. He competed at the 1968, 1972, and the 1976 Summer Olympics.

References

External links
 

1946 births
2021 deaths
People from Veselí nad Moravou
Czech male cyclists
Olympic cyclists of Czechoslovakia
Cyclists at the 1968 Summer Olympics
Cyclists at the 1972 Summer Olympics
Cyclists at the 1976 Summer Olympics
Sportspeople from the South Moravian Region